Agios Theodoros Tilliria is a village located in the Nicosia District of Cyprus, west of Kato Pyrgos.

References

Communities in Nicosia District